Statistics of Armenian Premier League in the 2000 season.

 FC Dinamo Yerevan and FC Mika-Kasakh are promoted.
 FC Mika-Kasakh is renamed FC Mika
 Tsement changed their name to FC Araks Ararat.
 FC Yerevan and Erebuni-Homenmen both withdrew before the start of the season. As a result, Kilikia FC who were originally relegated kept their place.
 FC Lernagorts Kapan are additionally promoted to have an eight team competition.

League table

Results

First half of season

Second half of season

Top goalscorers

See also
 2000 in Armenian football
 2000 Armenian First League
 2000 Armenian Cup

Armenian Premier League seasons
1
Armenia
Armenia